The New Deadwardians is an eight issue comic book series by Dan Abnett with artwork by I.N.J. Culbard. The series began publication in March 2012 by Vertigo. Abnett has stated that The New Deadwardians will span eight issues but that "we already have a very, very nice idea where we would go next with it, both in terms of the geopolitics of the world but a very specific other case for a second series".

Plot
The comic follows Chief Inspector George Suttle as he attempts to solve crimes in a post-Victorian England where the upper classes are composed of vampires and the lower class of zombies and humans. As Suttle tries to get to the bottom of an upper-class citizen's murder, he discovers that there's more to this murder than meets the eye.

Themes
Common themes in The New Deadwardians involve class relations as well as the women's rights movement as seen by suffragettes fighting for the right to become vampires on their own terms.

Reception
Reception for The New Deadwardians has been overwhelmingly positive, with Comic Book Resources calling it "inventive" and "unique". The New Jersey On-Line and Shock Till You Drop praised the story line, with Shock Till You Drop writing that "with an end date in sight it only makes me more impatient for the next issue because I want to see what happens next".

Crave Online commented that the series was "worth a look", but that while the artwork was bright and clean the characters' heads were occasionally misshapen.

Collected editions
The series has been collected in the form of a trade paperback:
 The New Deadwardians (collects The New Deadwardians #1-8, February 13, 2013)

References

External links
Official Vertigo page

Fiction set in 1910
2012 comics debuts
Alternate history comics
Comics by Dan Abnett
DC Comics vampires
England in fiction
Fantasy comics
Comics about magic
Vertigo Comics limited series
Zombies in comics